The Bridge of Flowers was a massive demonstration that took place on Sunday, 6 May 1990 along the Prut River separating Romania and the Moldavian SSR.

6 May 1990 
The first event took place on 6 May 1990. During this action, inhabitants of Romania were allowed that day, between 1 and 7 pm, to cross the Prut River in the Moldavian Soviet Socialist Republic without passports and visas.

Inhabitants from both sides of the border, which had been tightly enforced since World War II (for two decades prior to which much of Moldova had been part of the Kingdom of Romania), gathered on each bank, many crossing what had been described as a watery Berlin Wall to see family members long separated by the frontier.

The number of participants has been estimated at 1.2 million people. At Ungheni, approximately 250,000 crossed the border. The demonstration organized by the Cultural League for the unity of Romanians everywhere, in collaboration with the Bucharest–Chișinău Cultural Society and the Popular Front of Moldova, began early in the morning as thousands appeared on the Romanian side with armfuls of flowers. Participants began throwing flowers into the water that soon covered the surface of the river, symbolically creating a bridge between the two sides. At noon, a group of priests celebrated a Te Deum, after which church bells on both sides rang for a long time. Then, more flowers were thrown into the river and meetings on the bridge began to take place. Speeches, slogans and appeals were absent. Popular music and games, festive meals and similar activities followed, with the event wrapping up around 6 pm.

After this action, the procedures of crossing the Romanian–Soviet border were simplified considerably.

16 June 1991 
The second Bridge of Flowers took place on 16 June 1991. This time, the inhabitants of Moldova were able to cross the border without papers into Romania. According to a report released by Rompres, more than 150,000 people from Bessarabia crossed the border at Sculeni into Iași County. Among them was a delegation of Members of Parliament of the Republic of Moldova led by Nicolae Costin, the Mayor of Chișinău.

In Galați, in front of the Precista Church, arose on this occasion a crucifix symbolizing the union. This 1991 version of the Bridge of Flowers saw a similar number of people who attended the first Bridge of Flowers in 1990.

Testimonies

Reactions 
  At the request of Mikhail Gorbachev, French President François Mitterrand asked by phone his Romanian counterpart not to commit any imprudence.

References

External links
 "Podul de flori – prima deschidere a frontierelor dintre România și Republica Moldova" ("The Bridge of Flowers – First Border Crossing Opened between Romania and the Republic of Moldova", in Jurnalul de Botoșani și Dorohoi, May 7, 2005
 Ştefan Plugaru, "Istoricul Asociației Culturale „Pro Basarabia și Bucovina”, Filiala „Mihail Kogălniceanu” Huși" ("History of the Pro Basarabia and Bucovina Cultural Association, Mihail Kogălniceanu Chapter, Huși")
 "Podul de flori", tvr.ro, with footage of the event

Protests in Moldova
Protests in Romania
Dissolution of the Soviet Union
1990 protests
May 1990 events in Romania
1990 in the Moldavian Soviet Socialist Republic
1990 in the Soviet Union
Moldavian Soviet Socialist Republic
Political history of Moldova
Cultural history of Moldova
Moldova–Romania relations
Romania–Soviet Union relations
Protests in the Soviet Union
Romanian Revolution
Romanian nationalism in Moldova